Artificial Intelligence is a scientific journal on artificial intelligence research. It was established in 1970 and is published by Elsevier. The journal is abstracted and indexed in Scopus and Science Citation Index. The 2021 Impact Factor for this journal is 14.05 and the 5-Year Impact Factor is 11.616.

References

Artificial intelligence publications
Computer science journals
Elsevier academic journals
Publications established in 1970

External links 

 Official website